Courage is the sixth studio album released by Frankie J on December 7, 2011, after his departure from Columbia Records.

Track listing

References

2011 albums
Frankie J albums